Caldes (Caudés or Cjaudés in local dialect) is a comune (municipality) in Trentino in the northern Italian region Trentino-Alto Adige/Südtirol, located about  northwest of Trento.

The municipality of Caldes contains the frazioni (subdivisions, mainly villages and hamlets) Bozzana, Bordiana, Tozzaga, Cassana, S. Giacomo, and Samoclevo.

Caldes borders the following municipalities: Bresimo, Cis, Malè, Cles, Terzolas, and Cavizzana.

Demographic evolution

References

Cities and towns in Trentino-Alto Adige/Südtirol